Arab Indonesian cuisine (Indonesian: Masakan Arab-Indonesia) is characterized by the mixture of Middle Eastern cuisine with local Indonesian-style. Arab Indonesians brought their legacy of Arab cuisine—originally from Hadhramaut, Hejaz and Egypt—and modified some of the dishes with the addition of Indonesian ingredients. The Arabs arrived in the Nusantara archipelago to trade and spread Islam. In Java, since the 18th century AD, most of Arab traders settled on the north coast and diffuse with indigenous, thus affecting the local cuisine culture, especially in the use of mutton meat and ghee in cooking.

List of Arab Indonesian foods
This list also includes Indonesian dishes that has experienced of acculturation or assimilation to Arab cuisine.

Dishes
 Asinan nanas, pineapple in spicy and sour sauce.
 Gulai, curry dish with main ingredients might be poultry, goat meat, beef, mutton, various kinds of offal, fish and seafood, and also vegetables such as cassava leaves and unripe jackfruit.
 Hummus, a dip, spread, or savory dish made from cooked, mashed chickpeas blended with tahini, lemon juice, and garlic.
 Kamir, a round-shaped bread that almost similar to appam, consisting of flour, butter, and egg mixture.
 Kofta, meatballs or meatloaf of minced or ground meat—usually beef, chicken, or lamb—mixed with spices or onions. 
 Manakish, pizza-like flatbread.
 Marak, goat meat dish with pumpkin and chicken meat.
 Murtabak, stuffed pancake or pan-fried bread, sometimes filled with beef and scallions.
 Naan, a leavened, oven-baked flatbread. It is usually eaten with an array of sauces such as curries.
 Nasi kabsah, mixed rice dish.
 Nasi kebuli, steamed rice dish cooked in goat broth, milk, and ghee. Usually served during Mawlid.
 Nasi gonjleng, steamed rice with spices, very similar in terms of flavor with Nasi Kebuli.
 Nasi goreng domba, a mutton fried rice.
 Nasi goreng kambing, a spicy fried rice with goat meat, cooked in ghee.
 Nasi samin, fragrant yellow rice dish cooked in spices
 Nasi mandi, rice dish made from rice, meat (lamb, goat or chicken), and a mixture of spices.
 Nasi minyak, a cooked rice with ghee and spices.
 Rabeg, mutton dish. 
 Roti maryam, roti canai—influenced by Indian paratha.
 Roti pita, yeast-leavened round flatbread baked from wheat flour, sometimes with a pocket.
 Saltah, stew dish with the base is a brown meat stew called marak, a dollop of fenugreek froth, and sahawiq. Rice, potatoes, scrambled eggs, and vegetables are common additions to saltah.
 Sate kambing, a satay variant made of goat meat.
 Shawarma, roasted meat, especially when cooked on a revolving spit and shaved for serving in sandwiches.
 Tabbouleh, vegetarian salad.
 Tongseng, a dish of goat meat, mutton or beef stew dish in curry-like soup with vegetables and sweet soy sauce.

Desserts and snacks
 Asida, Moluccan pudding dish made up of a cooked wheat flour lump of dough, sometimes with added butter or honey. It is popular during Ramadan.
 Falafel, spiced mashed chickpeas formed into balls or fritters and deep-fried.
 Ka'ak, biscuit or cookie shaped into a ring.
 Kaak, small circular biscuit.
 Katayef,  a sort of sweet dumpling filled with cream or nuts.
 Maamoul, filled pastry or cookie made with dates, nuts such as pistachios or walnuts and occasionally almonds, or figs.
 Makmur, traditional Arab-Malay pastry, made from butter, ghee and flour. Usually served during special occasion of Eid ul-Fitr.
 Samosa, a fried or baked dumpling with a savoury filling, such as spiced potatoes, onions, peas, or lentils.

Gallery

See also

 Cuisine of Indonesia
 List of Indonesian dishes
 Arab Indonesian
 Arab cuisine

References

 
 
 
Indonesia
Indonesian cuisine-related lists
Arab diaspora in Indonesia